The wolf has been widely used in many forms in heraldry during the Middle Ages. Though commonly reviled as a livestock predator and man-eater, the wolf was also considered a noble and courageous animal, and frequently appeared on the arms and crests of numerous noble families. It typically symbolised the rewards of perseverance in long sieges or hard industry.

History

British Isles and other Anglophone heraldries
Wolves appear frequently in English heraldry, and is found as both a charge and a supporter. Wolves' heads, without the rest of the body being depicted, are particularly common in Scottish heraldry.

Early depictions of wolves in heraldry tend to be somewhat ambiguous in appearance, and can be confused with other heraldic creatures such as lynxes and foxes.

Edward IV (1442–83) used a white wolf for one of his badges, along with a white lion, denoting his descent from the House of Mortimer.

The wolf or his head is often used for canting on names such as Videlou, de Lou (both recorded in the anonymous Great Roll of 1308–14), Lupus (in the reign of Edward III), Wolferston (in the Henry VI Roll, circa 1422–61), Wolseley, Lovett, Low, Lovell, Lupton and of course Wolfe.

Wolves are to be found
 rampant in the coat of Louth Town Council (England)
 demi in the crest of Peter John Crabtree (Canada)
 demi and winged in the crest of Walter William Roy Bradford (Canada)
 heads only in the coat of James Thomas Flood (Canada)
 as supporters in the bearings of the Corporation of the Municipality of Greenstone, Ontario
 in  the Salish style in the coat of the Village of Belcarra, British Columbia

The "Enfield beast", an imaginary creature with the combined head of a fox, front talons of an eagle and legs and tail of a wolf, appears as the crest of the Irish family of Kelly and is also used in the coat and as a supporter for the former Enfield Borough Council and its successor the London Borough of Enfield (England).

Continental Europe
The wolf is also featured in the heraldry of continental European nations. Wolves feature very commonly in Spanish heraldry, where they are often represented wolves carrying the bodies of lambs in their mouths or across their backs. When in such a pose, wolves are referred to as being ravissant.

Wolves are also common in German heraldry.  The town of Passau (Bavaria) bears a red wolf rampant on a white shield.  In Saxony, a black wolf rampant on a yellow shield features on the crest of von Wolfersdorf family. A green wolf grasping a dead swan in its jaws on a yellow shield is depicted on the crest and Arms of the Counts von Brandenstein-Zeppelin.

In Italian heraldry, the attributed arms of Romulus and Remus were said to depict the Capitoline Wolf. An undated Milanese badge allegedly in the Biblioteca Trivulziana, Milan, shows a lamb lying on its back with a wolf standing over it. 
 
In French heraldry, the Wolfcatcher Royal had as his official insignia two wolf heads facing frontally.

A horned, wolf-like creature called the Calopus or Chatloup was at one time connected with the Foljambe and Cathome family.

Modernly, the coat of arms of the secular separatists  in Chechnya bore the wolf, because the wolf (borz) is the Chechen (or Ichkerian) nation's national embodiment. The Islamists later removed it, and the Russian-sponsored ruling regime removed it entirely, but the secular government in exile still uses. In addition, many other insignia of the Chechen nation (of all three governments) use the wolf as a heraldic symbol. Not only is it the national animal, but the Chechen people are symbolically said to be variously related to wolves (not in a serious way, but in an either symbolic or joking manner), and there are legends of their ancestors being raised by a "wolf mother". Characteristics of the wolf are also frequently compared to the Chechen people in a poetic sense, including the most famous line that members of the Chechen nation are "free and equal like wolves".

Examples of wolves in heraldry

References

 The Use of the Wolf as an Emblem of Heraldry, WolfSongAlaska.org

Further reading

 Boutell, Charles (1890). Heraldry, Ancient and Modern: Including Boutell's Heraldry. London: Frederick Warne. 
Brooke-Little, J P, Norroy and Ulster King of Arms, An heraldic alphabet (new and revisded edition), Robson Books, London, 1985 (first edition 1975); very few illustrations
 Civic Heraldry of England and Wales, fully searchable with illustrations,  http://www.civicheraldry.co.uk
 Clark, Hugh (1892). An Introduction to Heraldry, 18th ed. (Revised by J. R. Planché). London: George Bell & Sons. First published 1775. . 
 Canadian Heraldic Authority, Public Register, with many useful official versions of modern coats of arms, searchable online http://archive.gg.ca/heraldry/pub-reg/main.asp?lang=e
 Cussans, John E. (2003). Handbook of Heraldry. Kessinger Publishing. . 
 Fox-Davies, Arthur Charles (1909). A Complete Guide to Heraldry. New York: Dodge Pub. Co. . 
Friar, Stephen (ed) A New Dictionary of Heraldry  Alphabooks, Sherborne, 1987; with very few illustration of attitudes* Greaves, Kevin, A Canadian Heraldic Primer, Heraldry Society of Canada, Ottawa, 2000, lots but not enough illustrations
 Heraldry Society (England), members' arms, with illustrations of bearings, only accessible by armiger's name (though a Google site search would provide full searchability), http://www.theheraldrysociety.com/resources/members.htm
 Heraldry Society of Scotland, members' arms, fully searchable with illustrations of bearings, http://heraldry-scotland.com/copgal/thumbnails.php?album=7
 Innes of Learney, Sir Thomas, Lord Lyon King of Arms Scots Heraldry (second edition)Oliver and Boyd, Edinburgh, 1956
 Moncreiffe of Easter Moncreiffe, Iain, Kintyre Pursuivant of Arms, and Pottinger, Don, Herald Painter Extraordinary to the Court of the Lord Lyon King of Arms Simple Heraldry, Thomas Nelson and Sons, London andf Edinburgh, 1953; splendidly illustrated
 Neubecker, Ottfried (1976). Heraldry: Sources, Symbols and Meaning. Maidenhead, England: McGraw-Hill. .
 Royal Heraldry Society of Canada, Members' Roll of Arms, with illustrations of bearings, only accessible by armiger's name (though a Google site search would provide full searchability), http://www.heraldry.ca/main.php?pg=l1
 South African Bureau of Heraldry,  data on registered heraldic representations (part of  National Archives of South Africa); searchable online (but no illustration), http://www.national.archsrch.gov.za/sm300cv/smws/sm300dl
 Volborth, Carl-Alexander von (1981). Heraldry: Customs, Rules and Styles. Poole, England: Blandford Press. . 
 Woodcock, Thomas and John Martin Robinson (1988). The Oxford Guide to Heraldry. Oxford: University Press. . 
 Woodward, John and George Burnett (1969). Woodward's a treatise on heraldry, British and foreign. Originally published 1892, Edinburgh: W. & A. B. Johnson. . 

Heraldic beasts
Medieval culture
Heraldry
Wolves in art
Mythological canines